Vania Larissa Tan (born 18 November 1995) is an Indonesian Chinese spiritual singer and former beauty queen. She won the title of Miss Indonesia 2013, and represented Indonesia at Miss World 2013, finishing as a Top 10 finalist.

Larissa is a professional singer who has been singing since the age of nine. She majored in Opera seria and won and a national student singing competition in 2008 and local talent competition in 2010. She was a winner of the Indonesian variety talent show, Indonesia's Got Talent in 2010.

Early life
Larrisa was born 18 November 1995 in Pontianak, West Kalimantan, to Liu and Pue Han. She has three elder sisters, Dian Pradana, Elysia Giovanni and Aurhea Catriona. She was educated at Pelita Harapan School, Jakarta.

Career

Indonesia's Got Talent
In 2010, she became the winner of Indonesia's Got Talent. Three years later, she became a participant in Miss Indonesia 2013.

Pageantry

Miss Indonesia 2013 
Larissa represented West Kalimantan at Miss Indonesia 2013 and was crowned by outgoing titleholder Ines Putri Tjiptadi Chandra on February 20, 2013 at the JiExpo, Kemayoran in North Jakarta, competing against 32 other contestants. She held the title from 20 February 2013 until 17 February 2014 before crowning her successor, Maria Asteria Sastrayu Rahajeng.

Miss World 2013 
Her victory in Miss Indonesia 2013 made her a representative for Indonesia in Miss World 2013, and also the host delegate in the pageant. She was a Top 10 semifinalist in Beach Fashion, while winning the Talent Competition. On final night, Larissa scored 172 points for her interview and was ranked 7th overall. She made the Top 10, but failed to make the final cut.

Personal life
In 2015, she married 26 year old Indonesian Chinese businessman, Wilson Pesik, in Bali, and on 5 May 2016, she gave birth to their son.

Discography

Studio album

Compilation album

Non-album song 
 "Rahasia" (2011)

References

External links 
  Contestants Profile: Vania di Miss Indonesia 2013.

1995 births
Living people
Indonesian beauty pageant winners
Miss Indonesia winners
Indonesian people of Chinese descent
Indonesian Christians
People from Pontianak
Miss World 2013 delegates
21st-century Indonesian women singers